In enzymology, a tyrosine—arginine ligase is an enzyme that catalyzes the chemical reaction

ATP + L-tyrosine + L-arginine  AMP + diphosphate + L-tyrosyl-L-arginine

The 3 substrates of this enzyme are ATP, L-tyrosine, and L-arginine, whereas its 3 products are AMP, diphosphate, and L-tyrosyl-L-arginine.

This enzyme belongs to the family of ligases, specifically those forming carbon-nitrogen bonds as acid-D-amino-acid ligases (peptide synthases).  The systematic name of this enzyme class is L-tyrosine:L-arginine ligase (AMP-forming). Other names in common use include tyrosyl-arginine synthase, kyotorphin synthase, kyotorphin-synthesizing enzyme, and kyotorphin synthetase.

References 

 

EC 6.3.2
Enzymes of unknown structure